In astrophysics, what is referred to as "entropy" is actually the adiabatic constant derived as follows.

Using the first law of thermodynamics for a quasi-static, infinitesimal process for a hydrostatic system

For an ideal gas in this special case, the internal energy, U, is only a function of the temperature T; therefore the partial derivative of heat capacity with respect to T is identically the same as the full derivative, yielding through some manipulation

Further manipulation using the differential version of the ideal gas law, the previous equation, and assuming constant pressure, one finds

For an adiabatic process  and recalling , one finds
{|
|
|-
|
|}

One can solve this simple differential equation to find

This equation is known as an expression for the adiabatic constant, K, also called the adiabat. From the ideal gas equation one also knows

where  is Boltzmann's constant.

This is what astrophysicists refer to as "entropy" and has units of [keV cm2]. This quantity relates to the thermodynamic entropy as

Astrophysics
Entropy